Ghostbusters 2016 can refer to

Ghostbusters (2016 film)
Ghostbusters (2016 video game)